Mārtiņš Zībarts (born 15 February 1974) is a Latvian basketball coach, currently head coach of Olympiacos. He was coach of Latvia women's national basketball team from 2015 to 2019.

External links
BACKGROUND/BIO

References

1974 births
Living people
Latvian expatriate basketball people in Russia
Latvian basketball coaches
Latvian expatriate basketball people in Greece
Basketball players from Riga